Manuel Ibern Alcalde (born 21 August 1946), nicknamed Lolo, is a Spanish water polo player. He competed in the men's tournament at the 1968 Summer Olympics.

References

External links
 
 
 
 

1946 births
Living people
Spanish male water polo players
Olympic water polo players of Spain
Water polo players at the 1968 Summer Olympics
Water polo players from Barcelona
20th-century Spanish people